Ruy Franco de Almeida Júnior (born 26 January 1989), known simply as Ruy, is a Brazilian footballer who plays for Ferroviário-CE, on loan from Paysandu as an attacking midfielder.

Club career
Born in Itapeva, São Paulo, Ruy graduated from Coritiba Foot Ball Club's youth setup. In 2010, he was promoted to the main squad, but made his debuts as a senior while on loan at Vilhena Esporte Clube.

Ruy was subsequently loaned to G.D. Ribeirão in Portugal and Arapongas Esporte Clube, signing permanently for the latter in 2013 after his contract expired. In June 2014 he was loaned to Maringá Futebol Clube, competing in Série D and returning to Arapongas in September.

On 16 December 2014, Ruy was presented at Operário Ferroviário Esporte Clube. An undisputed starter during his spell, he appeared in 17 matches and scored five goals in the 2015 Campeonato Paranaense as his team was crowned champions.

On 7 May 2015 Ruy returned to Coritiba, signing a three-year deal. Seven days later, already aged 26, he played his first match for the club, starting and scoring the first in a 2–1 home win against Fortaleza Esporte Clube for that year's Copa do Brasil.

Ruy made his Série A debut on 16 May, playing the full 90 minutes in a 2–0 home success over Grêmio Foot-Ball Porto Alegrense.

In April 2017 Ruy was loaned to América Mineiro for the 2017 Campeonato Brasileiro Série B season.

In January 2019, Ruy was loaned out to Vitória for the rest of the year.

Honours 
 Operário Ferroviário
 Campeonato Paranaense: 2015

 América Mineiro
 Campeonato Brasileiro Série B: 2017

References

External links
Coritiba official profile 

1989 births
Living people
Footballers from São Paulo (state)
Brazilian footballers
Association football midfielders
Campeonato Brasileiro Série A players
Campeonato Brasileiro Série B players
Campeonato Brasileiro Série D players
Segunda Divisão players
Coritiba Foot Ball Club players
Operário Ferroviário Esporte Clube players
América Futebol Clube (MG) players
Esporte Clube Vitória players
G.D. Ribeirão players
Maringá Futebol Clube players
Clube Náutico Capibaribe players
Brazilian expatriate footballers
Expatriate footballers in Portugal
Brazilian expatriate sportspeople in Portugal